is a Japanese politician, an independent and member of the House of Councillors in the Diet (national legislature). A native of Tamura, Fukushima and graduate of Waseda University, he had served in the assembly of Fukushima Prefecture for one term since 1987. He was elected to House of Representatives for the first time in 1993 after running unsuccessfully in 1990. After losing the seat in 2003, he was elected to the House of Councillors for the first time in 2004 as a member of the Liberal Democratic Party.

References

External links 
  in Japanese.

Members of the House of Representatives (Japan)
Members of the House of Councillors (Japan)
Waseda University alumni
Living people
1958 births
Liberal Democratic Party (Japan) politicians
New Renaissance Party politicians
New Party Nippon politicians